Alan Hunter (born 11 January 1944) is a former Australian rules footballer who played for the Footscray Football Club in the Victorian Football League (VFL).

Notes

External links 
		

Living people
1944 births
Australian rules footballers from Queensland
Western Bulldogs players